Jackson Manuel (born 24 February 2003) is a professional New Zealand footballer who plays as a midfielder for Wellington Phoenix.

Manuel was first called up to the Wellington Phoenix first team in December 2021, but did not appear for the club until 19 March 2022, making his debut in a 4–0 loss to Newcastle Jets.

Manuel is of Ngāti Porou and Spanish descent.

References

External links

Jackson Manuel profile

Living people
2003 births
New Zealand association footballers
Association football midfielders
Wellington Phoenix FC players